Kerimler can refer to:

 Kerimler, Güney
 Kerimler, Mersin